The 1908 All-Ireland Senior Hurling Championship Final was the 21st All-Ireland Final and the culmination of the 1908 All-Ireland Senior Hurling Championship, an inter-county hurling tournament for the top teams in Ireland. Tipperary were winners after a replay and extended their 100% record in All Ireland Finals to eight wins out of eight. This record came to an end when Tipperary got to the Final again in 1909 where they lost to Kilkenny.

Match details

References
 Corry, Eoghan, The GAA Book of Lists (Hodder Headline Ireland, 2005).
 Donegan, Des, The Complete Handbook of Gaelic Games (DBA Publications Limited, 2005).

1
All-Ireland Senior Hurling Championship Finals
Dublin GAA matches
Tipperary GAA matches
June 1909 sports events